Eric Ball may refer to:

Eric Ball (American football) (born 1966), former professional American football player
Eric Ball (composer) (1903–1989), English composer and conductor of brass band music